Sphenomorphus dussumieri, commonly known as Dussumier's forest skink and Dussumier's litter skink, is a species of skink, a lizard in the family Scincidae. The species is endemic to southern India.

Geographic range
S. dussumieri is found in the Western Ghats of India, in the Indian states of Kerala and Tamil Nadu

Etymology

The specific name, dussumieri, is in honor of Jean-Jacques Dussumier, a French voyager who collected zoological specimens in South Asia in the early 19th century. It is locally known as "അരണ (arana)".

Description

The head of S. dussumieri is distinct from the neck, and the snout is short. The tympanum is situated on the surface, not sunk as in other skinks. The body is slender. The dorsal scales are smooth, with fine striations. The limbs are relatively short. The dorsum is bronze brown, with dark spots. There is a light dorso-lateral stripe running from the eye to the side of the body, its inner edge with a dark brown, white spotted streak. There is also a broad stripe on the sides that is edged with white below. The venter is creamy.

Ecology

References

Further reading
Annandale N (1905). "Contributions to Oriental Herpetology. Suppl. III. Notes on the Oriental lizards in the Indian Museum, with a list of the species recorded from British India and Ceylon". J. Asiatic Soc. Bengal  (2) 1: 139-151.
Beddome RH (1870). "Descriptions of new reptiles from the Madras Presidency". Madras Monthly J. Med. Sci. 2: 169-176. [Reprint: 1940. J. Soc. Bibliogr. Nat. Sci., London 1 (10): 327-334.]
Boulenger GA (1887). Catalogue of the Lizards in the British Museum (Natural History). Second Edition. Volume III ... Scincidæ. London: Trustees of the British Museum (Natural History). (Taylor and Francis, printers). xii + 575 pp. + Plates I-XL. (Lygosoma dussumieri, pp. 243–244).
Boulenger GA (1890). The Fauna of British India, Including Ceylon and Burma. Reptilia and Batrachia. London: Secretary of State for India in Council. (Taylor and Francis, printers). xviii + 541 pp. (Lygosoma dussumieri, p. 197).
Duméril AMC, Bibron G (1839). Erpétologie générale ou Histoire naturelle complète des Reptiles. Tome cinquième [Volume 5]. Paris: Roret. viii + 854 pp. (Lygosoma dussumierii, new species, pp. 725–726). (in French).
Greer AE (1991). "Lankascincus, a new genus of scincid lizards from Sri Lanka, with descriptions of three new species". Journal of Herpetology 25 (1): 59-64.
Smith MA (1935). The Fauna of British India, Including Ceylon and Burma. Reptilia and Amphibia. Vol. II.—Sauria. London: Secretary of State for India in Council. (Taylor and Francis, printers). xiii + 440 pp. + Plate I + 2 maps. (Lygosoma dussumieri, pp. 286–287).
Smith MA (1937). "A review of the genus Lygosoma (Scincidae, Reptilia) and its allies". Rec. Indian Mus. 39 (3): 213-234.
Stoliczka F (1872). "Notes on various new or little-known Indian lizards". J. Asiatic Soc. Bengal  61 (2): 86-135.

External links

dussumieri
Reptiles of India
Taxa named by André Marie Constant Duméril
Taxa named by Gabriel Bibron
Reptiles described in 1839